Jan Broberg (July 31, 1962) is an American actress, singer, and dancer.

As a child, Broberg was kidnapped on two occasions by a family friend, at ages twelve and fourteen. The experience has been documented in her mother Mary Ann Broberg's book, Stolen Innocence: The Jan Broberg Story, the documentary Abducted in Plain Sight, and the drama miniseries A Friend of the Family.

Early life
Broberg was born on July 31, 1962, in Pocatello, Idaho, to Robert "Bob" Broberg and Mary Ann Broberg. She was the couple's first child, and she was followed by two younger sisters, Karen and Susan.

Career
Broberg has appeared in over a dozen feature films. Some of her film credits are Slaughter of the Innocents (HBO), The Poof Point (Disney), Message in a Cell Phone (Disney), The Secret Keeper (Columbia TriStar), Bug Off, Hope For Troubled Teens, Nadir, Family First, Little Secrets (Columbia TriStar), Mobsters and Mormons, and The Book of Mormon Movie, Vol. 1: The Journey. She also played the mother of the main character in Baptists at Our Barbecue, and co-starred with Elijah Wood in Maniac.

Broberg has appeared in many television series, including: Touched by an Angel (CBS), Promised Land (CBS), Remember Me (PBS), Death Row (PBS), The Man With Three Wives (the Norman Grayson story), Harmful Intent (NBC), Siege at Marion (NBC), Deliver Them from Evil: The Taking of Alta View (CBS), Ancient Secrets of the Bible (CBS Miniseries). Perhaps her most notable role was in the WB series Everwood as Nurse Louise.

Broberg has had stage roles in the following: The Sound of Music (Tuacahn Theatre), I Do! I Do! (Sundance Theatre), Jane Eyre (Glendale Center), My Fair Lady (Scera Theatre), Carousel (Idaho State University), Trixie True Teen Detective (BYU), No No Nanette (Playmill), and appeared with and directed for St. George Musical Theater.

In 2017, Broberg was executive director for the Kayenta Arts Foundation and Center for the Arts at Kayenta in Ivins, Utah.

Broberg helped produce A Friend of the Family a Peacock drama TV series, about her life.

Personal life
Broberg was kidnapped when she was twelve, and again when she was fourteen, both times by Robert Berchtold, a friend of the family. On October 30, 2003, she and her mother Mary Ann published a book titled Stolen Innocence: The Jan Broberg Story. 
Broberg's story was the feature of the true crime documentary Abducted in Plain Sight. Filmed and produced over a three-year period, it was released in January 2019. Robert Berchtold died by suicide in 2005.

She has a son from a previous marriage.

Recognition
In 2008, in St. George, UT, the Local Chapter of National Federation of Business and Professional Women's Clubs recognized, as the 2008 Women of Achievement, ten women, including Broberg.

In 2017, Broberg spoke to the St. George Area Chamber of Commerce Chamber inspiration luncheon, and the Hurricane Valley Chamber of Commerce luncheon.

Filmography

See also
List of kidnappings
List of solved missing person cases

References

External links

1962 births
1970s missing person cases
21st-century American women
Actresses from Idaho
American film actresses
American Latter Day Saints
American stage actresses
American television actresses
American women writers
Formerly missing people
Living people
Kidnapped American children
Missing person cases in Idaho
People from Pocatello, Idaho
Writers from Idaho